The Bedevilled is a 1975 Hong Kong horror film directed by Lo Wei and released under the Golden Harvest banner.

Cast
O Chun Hung
Reiko Ike
James Tien
Wong Lan
Dean Shek
Lee Kwan
Ouyang Sha-fei
Wong Sam
Gam Dai

External links
 The Bedeviled at HKcinemamagic.com

Hong Kong horror films
1975 films
1970s Mandarin-language films
1975 horror films
Golden Harvest films
1970s Hong Kong films